Brendan Patrick Donnelly (born 25 August 1950) is a pro-European Union British politician and former member of the European Parliament. 

Born in London, Donnelly was educated at St Ignatius' College in Tottenham, and then at Christ Church, Oxford.  He worked at the Foreign Office from 1976 until 1982, when he joined the secretariat of the Conservative Group in the European Parliament.  From 1986 to 1987, he was a political adviser to Lord Cockfield, and then from 1987 to 1990 worked as an independent consultant on the European Community.  At the 1989 European Parliament election, he stood unsuccessfully for the Conservatives in London West.

Donnelly was elected as a Member of the European Parliament (MEP) in Sussex South and Crawley at the 1994 European Parliament election for the Conservative Party.  He then left the party, continued as an independent for a period, and then co-founded and became deputy leader of the Pro-Euro Conservative Party at the 1999 European elections.

He failed to get elected and subsequently joined the Liberal Democrats. He stood in the 2009 European elections under the Yes2Europe political label. He stood in the 2014 European elections for the 4 Freedoms Party (UK EPP). He stood in the 2021 London Assembly election for Rejoin EU. He was unsuccessful in each case. He stood for Rejoin EU in the June 2021 Chesham and Amersham by-election.

Donnelly is director of the Federal Trust and, until 6 March 2010, was chair of the Federal Union, when he was succeeded by Richard Laming.

References

1950 births
Living people
Conservative Party (UK) MEPs
People educated at St Ignatius' College, Enfield
Politicians from London
MEPs for England 1994–1999
Pro-Euro Conservative Party MEPs
Liberal Democrats (UK) politicians
Politicians of the Pro-Euro Conservative Party
British political party founders